Raymond Pettibon (born Raymond Ginn, June 16, 1957) is an American artist who lives and works in New York City. Pettibon came to prominence in the early 1980s in the southern California punk rock scene, creating posters and album art mainly for groups on SST Records, owned and operated by his older brother, Greg Ginn. He has subsequently become widely recognized in the fine art world for using American iconography variously pulled from literature, art history, philosophy, and religion to politics, sport, and sexuality.

As Holland Cotter noted in The New York Times:

Early life

The fourth of five children born to R.C.K. Ginn, an English teacher who published several spy novels; his mother was a housewife. Pettibon grew up in Hermosa Beach, California. He was raised Christian Scientist. He earned an economics degree from UCLA in 1977 and worked as a high school mathematics teacher in the L.A. public school system for a short period, before pursuing and completing his BFA in 1977.

In 1976, his brother, guitarist/songwriter Greg Ginn, founded the influential punk rock band Black Flag. Initially, Pettibon had been a bass player in the group when it was known by the name Panic. When the band discovered that another band called Panic existed, Pettibon suggested the name Black Flag and designed their distinctive "four bars" logo, a stylized black flag rippling in the wind. Around the same time, Pettibon adopted his new surname, from the nickname petit bon (good little one) given to him by his father. Pettibon's artwork appeared on fliers, album covers and gift items (T-shirts, stickers and skateboards) for Black Flag through the early 1980s, and he became well known in the Los Angeles punk rock scene.

Pettibon is married to video artist Aïda Ruilova, with whom he has a son. He is an avid sports fan.

Work
Known for his comic-like drawings with disturbing, ironic or ambiguous text, Pettibon's subject matter is sometimes violent and anti-authoritarian. From the late 1970s through the mid-1980s, he was closely associated with the punk rock band Black Flag and the record label SST Records, both founded by his older brother Greg Ginn. In addition, Pettibon designed the cover of the 1990 Sonic Youth album Goo; bassist Kim Gordon had been a longtime admirer of Pettibon's art and written about him for Artforum in the 1980s. Beginning in the mid-1980s, he became a well-known figure in the contemporary art scene.

Pettibon works primarily with India ink on paper and many of his early drawings are black and white, although he sometimes introduces color through the use of pencil, watercolor, collage, gouache or acrylic paint. He has stated that his interest in this technique is a result of the influence of artists such as William Blake and Goya, and the style of political editorial cartoons. His drawings come out by the hundreds. He started to publish them as limited-edition photocopied booklets in 1978. These booklets, which he continues to produce as "Superflux Pubs," are considered "the sum of his ideas and aesthetics". Pettibon started working in collage in the mid-80s with simple newsprint elements collaged onto black and white images. In his new works, the artist again uses the means of collage.

A retrospective of Pettibon's work entitled A Pen of All Work, spanned three floors of New York City's New Museum in 2017.

Public art projects
For New York's High Line, Pettibon created a temporary billboard in 2013, displaying a 2010 baseball drawing called No Title (Safe he called ...) and featuring Jackie Robinson of the Brooklyn Dodgers sliding home.

Other projects
In addition to his works on paper, Pettibon has also made animations from his drawings, live action films from his own scripts, unique artist's books, fanzines, prints, and large permanent wall drawings that often include an arrangement of his own works on paper almost creating an installation of collage. In the early 1990s, fellow artist Mike Kelley played guitar on an album of songs that Pettibon recorded for the independent label Blast First out of New York and London. He is now the lead singer of the Niche Makers, a band based in Venice, California.

Together with German sound artist Oliver Augst he released the musical "The Whole World Is Watching" (with Schorsch Kamerun, Keiji Haino and Marcel Daemgen) in 2007 as part of the MaerzMusik festival of the Berliner Festspiele, Berlin.

Pettibon's artwork inspired the music video for the 2011 song "Monarchy of Roses" by Red Hot Chili Peppers. Pettibon is also mentioned in the song's lyrics.
 
In June 2013, a new documentary series, The Art of Punk was released on YouTube. The first episode features the art of Black Flag and Pettibon.

Radio plays
 What we know is secret (Augst/Pettibon), Deutschlandfunk 2019
 The whole world is watching (Augst/Pettibon), Hessischer Rundfunk (national public radio in Germany) 2008
 Long live the people of the revolution (Augst/Korn), Hessischer Rundfunk 2004

Album covers (selection) 
Oliver Augst
 What we know is secret (LP) 2020
 You're the Top (ski) (vinyl single) 2019
 Blank Meets Pettibon  (The Berlin Concert) (LP, picture disc) 2016
 Wooden Heart (single, picture disc) 2015
 Burma Shave Electrics (LP, picture disc) 2013
 Long Live the People of the Revolution (LP) 2005
 Blank Meets Pettibon (CD) 2003

1208
Feedback Is Payback

Big Walnuts Yonder
Big Walnuts Yonder

Black Flag
Family Man
In My Head
Jealous Again
Loose Nut
My War
Nervous Breakdown
Six Pack
Slip It In
The Complete 1982 Demos (Plus More!)

Cerebral Ballzy
Cerebral Ballzy

Foo Fighters
Have It All (single)
One By One

Mike Watt
Ball-Hog or Tugboat?

Minutemen
Paranoid Time
What Makes a Man Start Fires?

Off!
First Four EPs
Off!
Wasted Years

Saccharine Trust
Past Lives

Sonic Youth
"Disappearer" (single)
Goo

Unknown Instructors
The Master's Voice

Exhibition history

Group exhibitions 
Pettibon began exhibiting his work in group shows in galleries in the 1980s. In 1992, Pettibon was invited to participate in Helter Skelter: L.A. Art in the 1990s, curated by Paul Schimmel at the Museum of Contemporary Art, Los Angeles (MOCA).

In 1993, Pettibon was included in the Whitney Biennial along with Noni Grevillea. By the mid-90s, Pettibon had exhibited extensively, including exhibitions at the Museum of Modern Art, New York; the Museum of Contemporary Art, Los Angeles (MOCA); Kunsthaus Zurich; White Columns, New York. In the late 90s, Pettibon to exhibited internationally including shows at the Tramway (arts centre) in Glasgow, Scotland, the Hammer Museum, Los Angeles and the 1997 Whitney Biennial.

In 2002, Pettibon participated in documenta XI in Kassel, Germany, curated by Okwui Enwezor. In 2004, Pettibon participated in the Site Santa Fe Fifth International Biennial exhibition: Disparities and Deformations: Our Grotesque, curated by Robert Storr. For this exhibition, he created his first animation using his own drawings.  That same year, Pettibon participated in the Whitney Biennial for the third time and was awarded the prestigious Bucksbaum Award for his installation of drawings.

In 2007, Dominic Molon of the Museum of Contemporary Art, Chicago organized an exhibition titled, Sympathy for the Devil: Art and Rock and Roll since 1967, and included a selection of Pettibon's original drawings from Black Flag concert flyers and album covers.

In 2008, Pettibon participated in the California Biennial, organized by Lauri Firstenberg, which featured one of his works as a large billboard on the Sunset Strip in Los Angeles. In 2010, Pettibon participated in the Liverpool Biennial curated by Lorenzo Fusi. In 2011, Rizzoli released a comprehensive monograph, edited by Ralph Rugoff, the most comprehensive publication of Pettibon's works to date.

Solo exhibitions 
Barry Blinderman gave Pettibon his first solo exhibition at the Semaphore Gallery in New York in 1986. In 1995, he had his first major solo exhibition at David Zwirner Gallery. By the mid-1990s he had his first solo museum exhibition at the Kunsthalle Bern in Switzerland, which traveled to Paris. In 1998, a self-titled show opened at the Renaissance Society in Chicago, and traveled to the Drawing Center in New York; the Philadelphia Museum of Art; and the Museum of Contemporary Art, Los Angeles. In 2002, he had a solo exhibition, Raymond Pettibon Plots Laid Thick, organized by Museu D’art Contemporani de Barcelona (MACBA), which traveled to Tokyo Opera City Art Gallery, Tokyo and GEM, Museum Voor Actuele Kunst, The Hague, The Netherlands.

In 2006, Pettibon had a major solo survey exhibition at the Centro de Arte Contemporaneo de Malaga, Spain that traveled to the kestnergesellschaft in Hannover, Germany.  A comprehensive catalogue was produced on the occasion of both exhibitions. In 2007, Pettibon participated in the Venice Biennial, Think with the Senses – Feel with the Mind: Art in the Present Tense, curated by Robert Storr for which he created a unique wall drawing installation.

 2013: "PUNK cabinet de curiosités MADE IN Raymond Pettibon", galerie mfc-michèle didier, Paris.
 2016  "HOMO AMERICANUS" Sammlung Falckenberg , Hamburg

Publications 
Monographs of Pettibon's work include: Raymond Pettibon, published by Centro de Arte Contemporaneo de Malaga for his solo exhibition in 2006 at the museum in Malaga, Spain and subsequently traveled to the kestnergesellschaft in Hannover, Germany.  Whatever You're Looking For You Wont’ Find It here, published by the Kunsthalle Wien to accompany Pettibon's exhibition in 2006; Turn to the Title Page, an artist book that was specially created as a part of Pettibon's one-artist exhibition at the Whitney Museum in 2005; Raymond Pettibon: Plots Laid Thick published by MACBA in Barcelona, Spain in 2002; Raymond Pettibon, published by Phaidon Press, Inc. in 2001; Raymond Pettibon: A Pen of All Work, published by Phaidon Press, Inc. in 2017; Raymond Pettibon: The Books 1978–98, edited by Roberto Ohrt and published by Verlag der Buchhandlung Walter Konig and DAP, New York in 2000; and Raymond Pettibon: A Reader, published by the Philadelphia Museum of Art and the Renaissance Society at the University of Chicago in 1998.  That same year the Renaissance Society also published, Thinking of You a limited edition artist book.  Raymond Pettibon, published by Kunsthalle Bern, edited by Ulrich Loock in 1995.

Collections 
Pettibon's work is included in the collection of many museums and institutions worldwide including: The Armand Hammer Museum, Los Angeles, CA; The Art Institute of Chicago, Chicago, IL; Dallas Museum of Art, Dallas, Texas; Ellipse Foundation Contemporary Art Collection, Lisbon, Portugal; FRAC Nord-Pas de Calais, Lille, France; Kunstmuseum St. Gallen, St. Gallen, Switzerland; Hamburger Bahnhof, Museum für Gegenwart, Berlin, Germany; Laguna Art Museum, Laguna Beach, CA; Los Angeles County Museum of Art, Los Angeles, CA; Ludwig Museum, Köln, Germany; Milwaukee Art Museum, Milwaukee, WI; Museion, Bolzano, Italy; Museum Boijmans van Beuningen, Rotterdam, The Netherlands; Museum of Contemporary Art, Chicago, IL; Museum of Contemporary Art, Los Angeles, CA; Museum of Contemporary Art, San Diego, CA; Museum of Modern Art, New York, NY; Neue Galerie der Stadt Linz, Linz, Austria; Philadelphia Museum of Art, Philadelphia, PA; Pomona College Museum of Art, Claremont, CA; Saint Louis Art Museum, St. Louis, MO; Sammlung Goetz, Munich, Germany; San Francisco Museum of Modern Art, San Francisco, CA; Stiftung Kunsthalle Bern, Bern, Switzerland; Tate Modern, London, United Kingdom; Vancouver Art Gallery, Vancouver, British Columbia, Canada; Walker Art Center, Minneapolis, MN; Whitney Museum of American Art, New York, NY; WIMNAM/CCI, Centre Pompidou, Paris, France.

Recognition 
Raymond Pettibon is the recipient of numerous awards and prizes.  In 1991, he was awarded the Louis Comfort Tiffany Foundation Award for which a catalog was produced. In 2001, the Museum Ludwig named Pettibon the winner of its Wolfgang Hahn Prize. In 2003, Pettibon was awarded the Grand Prize of Honor for his participation in the 25th Biennial of Graphic Arts, Ljubljana, Slovenia. For the 2004 Whitney Biennial, Pettibon was invited to create an installation of drawings for the exhibition. He was awarded the Bucksbaum Award for his installation, the world's largest award given to an individual artist. (The Bucksbaum Award is awarded every two years and is always given to an artist whose work is displayed in that year's Whitney Biennial.) As part of the honor, the Whitney Museum organized a solo exhibition that opened in the Fall of 2005, featuring new works and published an artist's book for the occasion. Most recently, Pettibon was awarded the University of Vienna's Oscar Kokoschka Prize for 2010. Established by the Austrian government in 1980, following the painter's death, the Kokoschka Prize is awarded to a contemporary artist every two years.

Art market
The artist is represented by Regen Projects, Los Angeles and David Zwirner, New York. He regularly shows with Contemporary Fine Arts, Berlin and Sadie Coles HQ, London. In 2011, on the occasion of Ben Stiller and David Zwirner’s Artists For Haiti charity auction at Christie's, Pettibon's No Title (But the sand), sold for $820,000.

Bibliography

References

External links

Official Website
Raymond Pettibon at David Zwirner
Selected Press at David Zwirner
Raymond Pettibon on Artnet
Raymond Pettibon at Kadist Art Foundation
Raymond Pettibon Kapsul Image Collection

1957 births
Living people
American printmakers
Artists from California
Hardcore punk musicians
Unknown Instructors members
American contemporary artists
Art in Greater Los Angeles
Artists from Tucson, Arizona
Black Flag (band) members